Banaba is an island in the Pacific Ocean.

Banaba may also refer to:

 Banaba (Lagerstroemia speciosa), a type of tree that grows in most of Southeast Asia, including Thailand, the Philippines and Malaysia
 Banaba, an area in Batangas City, the Philippines
 Banaba, an area in Tarlac City, the Philippines
 Banaba, a district near Cotenna in Roman Asia Minor

See also 
 Barnaba (disambiguation)

et:Banaba